Robert atte Mille (fl. 1381–1402) of Guildford, Surrey, was an English politician.

Family
His family were from the Surrey area. His wife was named Alice.

Career
He was a Member (MP) of the Parliament of England for Guildford in 1381 and 1402.

References

14th-century births
15th-century deaths
English MPs 1381
English MPs 1402
Members of Parliament for Guildford